The Euryalida are an order of brittle stars, which includes large species with either branching arms (called "basket stars") or long and curling arms (called "snake stars").

Characteristics 
Many of the species in this order have characteristic repeatedly branched arms (a shape known as "basket stars", which includes most Gorgonocephalidae and two species in the family Euryalidae), while the other species have very long and curling arms, and go rather by the name of "snake stars" (mostly abyssal species). Many of them live in deep sea habitats or cold waters, though some basket stars can be seen at night in shallow tropical reefs. Most young basket stars live on specific type of coral. In the wild they may live up to 35 years. They weigh up to  Like other echinoderms, basket stars lack blood and achieve gas exchange via their water vascular system.

The basket stars are the largest ophiuroids with Gorgonocephalus stimpsoni measuring up to 70 cm in arm length with a disk diameter of 14 cm.

Systematics and phylogeny
The fossil record of this group is rather poor and only dates back to Carboniferous.
Basket stars are divided into the following families:
 family Asteronychidae Ljungman, 1867 -- 4 genera (11 species)
 family Euryalidae Gray, 1840, emended Okanishi et al., 2011 -- 11 genera (89 species)
 family Gorgonocephalidae Ljungman, 1867 -- 34 genera (96 species)
 sub-family Astrocloninae Okanishi & Fujita, 2018
 sub-family Astrothamninae Okanishi & Fujita, 2013
 sub-family Astrotominae Matsumoto, 1915
 sub-family Gorgonocephalinae Döderlein, 1911

Gallery

References

External links
 

Ophiuroidea
Phrynophiurida